The pottery of ancient Cyprus starts during the Neolithic period. 
Throughout the ages, Cypriot ceramics demonstrate many connections with cultures from around the Mediterranean.
During the Early and Middle Bronze Ages, it is especially imaginative in shape and decoration. There are also many early terracotta figurines that were produced depicting female figures.

The typo-chronology of Cypriot pottery for the Iron Age was established by Einar Gjerstad based on material excavated by the Swedish Cyprus Expedition. Gjerstad divided the Iron Age into three periods, the Cypro-Geometric (1050-750 BC), the Cypro-Archaic (750-480 BC) and the Cypro-Classical (480-310 BC), which are in turn subdivided, the CG I-III, the CA I-II and the CC I-II, each period corresponds to one pottery Type, with a total of seven, Types I-VII. The exact dates of the chronology of Gjerstad have been slightly revised following more current research. The typochronology is explained in his main work Swedish Cyprus Expedition IV, 2. The Cypro-geometric, Cypro-archaic and Cypro-classical Periods (1948) with further remarks made in the article Pottery Types, Cypro-Geometric to Cypro-Classical (1960).

Neolithic Age
The earliest widely used ceramics during the 5th millennium BC are of the Dark Faced Burnished Ware type. 
This ceramic technique was followed by the following techniques:
 Red on White ware
 "Combed ware" 
 Painted and Combed ware, a combination of the two previous types

Bronze Age 

"Red Polished Ware" has been found from the start of the Bronze Age in Cyprus.

White-slip Ware was made c. 1600-1200 BC.

Base-ring Ware is also considered to be a "typical Cypriot" ceramic "of the Late Bronze Age".

Early Iron Age

During the Iron Age the pottery was "colorful and often elaborately painted with geometric or figural motifs. Intricate 'Free-field' compositions graced juglets and jars. Ubiquitous concentric circles were applied to jars, juglets, bowls and kraters using multiple brushes. Finer wares like plates, bowls and jugs were made on the fast wheel, while larger forms like amphoras, amphoroid kraters and pithoi were built with a combination of techniques: wheel throwing, hand coiling or molding."

Cypro-Geometric I
During the period 1050-950 BC, characteristic pottery were
 "White Painted I"
 "Bichrome I" Ware"
 "Plain White I"
 "Black Slip I"

Cypro-Geometric II
During the period 950-900 BC, characteristic pottery were
 "White Painted II Ware"
 "Bichrome II"
 "Plain White II"
 "Black Slip II"

Cypro-Geometric III
During the period 900-750 BC, characteristic pottery were
 White Painted III Ware
 Bichrome III
 Plain White III
 Black Slip III
 Red Slip I
 Black on Red I
 Grey & Black Polished I

Cypro-Archaic I
During the period 750-600 BC, characteristic pottery were
 White Painted IV "Free-field Style"
 Bichrome IV "Free-field Style"
 Plain White IV
 Black Slip IV
 Red Slip II
 Black on Red II
 Grey & Black Polished II
 Bichrome Red I

Cypro-Archaic II
During the period 600-480 BC, characteristic pottery were
 White Painted V Ware
 Bichrome V
 Plain White V
 Black Slip V
 Red Slip III
 Black on Red III
 Bichrome Red II

Cypro-Classical I
During the period 480-400 BC, characteristic pottery were
 White Painted VI Ware
 Bichrome VI
 Plain White VI
 Black Slip VI
 Red Slip IV
 Black on Red IV
 Bichrome Red III
 Black & Grey Lustrous I
 Stroke Polished I

Cypro-Classical II
During the period 400-310 BC, characteristic pottery were
 White Painted VII Ware
 Bichrome VII
 Plain White VII
 Red Slip V
 Black on Red V
 Black & Grey Lustrous II
 Stroke Polished II

References

Further reading
Boardman, John. 2001. The History of Greek Vases: Potters, Painters, Pictures. New York: Thames & Hudson.
Cook, Robert Manuel, and Pierre Dupont. 1998. East Greek Pottery. London: Routledge.
Farnsworth, Marie. 1964. "Greek Pottery: A Mineralogical Study." American Journal of Archaeology 68 (3): 221–28. 
Gjerstad, Einar, and Yves Calvet. 1977. Greek Geometric and Archaic Pottery Found In Cyprus. Stockholm: Svenska institutet i Athen.
Luke, Joanna. 2003. Ports of Trade, Al Mina and Geometric Greek Pottery In the Levant. Oxford: Archaeopress.

See also

 Larnaca District Archaeological Museum
 Cyprus Museum
 Pierides Museum (Larnaca)
 Pit–Comb Ware culture
 Slip (ceramics)
 Philia culture
 Ancient Cypriot art

Ancient pottery